The 2013 Missouri Valley Conference men's soccer season was the 23rd season of men's varsity soccer in the conference. The defending regular and postseason champions, Creighton, left the conference to join the new Big East Conference.

The 2013 Missouri Valley Conference Men's Soccer Tournament was hosted and won by Bradley.

Changes from 2012 

 Creighton left for the Big East Conference.
 Loyola joined The Valley from the Horizon League.

Teams

Season outlook 
2013 Preseason Coaches' Poll

2013 Preseason MVC All-Conference Team

MVC Tournament

Honors

2013 NSCAA/Continental Tire NCAA Division I Men's All-Midwest Region Teams
First Team— Midfielder James Fawke, Missouri State; Midfielder Faik Hajderovic, Evansville; Forward Wojciech Wojcik, Bradley

Second Team— Goalkeeper Brian Billings, Bradley; Defender Alec Bartlett, Drake; Forward Mark Anthony Gonzalez, Evansville

Third Team— Goalkeeper Trevor Spangenberg, Missouri State; Defender Grant Bell, Bradley; Midfielder Matt Polster, SIUE; Forward Christian Okeke, Bradley

2013 MVC All-Conference First Team

2013 MVC All-Freshman Team

Statistics

See also 

 Missouri Valley Conference
 Missouri Valley Conference men's soccer tournament
 2013 NCAA Division I men's soccer season
 2013 in American soccer

References 

 
Missouri Valley Conference
2013 NCAA Division I men's soccer season